Anna Anni (1926 in Marradi1 January 2011 in Florence) was an Italian costume designer. She was co-nominated with Maurizio Millenotti for the Academy Award for Best Costume Design for their work in the film Otello (1986).

Filmography 
Per Firenze (1982)
Pagliacci (1982)
Cavalleria rusticana (1982)
Otello (1986)
Giselle (1987)
Turandot (1988) 
Don Giovanni (1990)
Don Carlo (1992) 
Carmen (1997) 
Tea with Mussolini (1999)
Callas Forever (2002)
Carmen (2003) 
Metropolitan Opera: Live in HD (2009)

References

External links 

1926 births
2011 deaths
People from Marradi
Italian costume designers